Kenny W. Mann is a politician who served as a member of the West Virginia Senate, from the 10th district since 2017 to 2020. Mann is a former Member of the Monroe County Board of Education.

Education 
Mann holds an associate degree in Mortuary science from Mid-America College of Funeral Service and a Bachelor's degree in Business Administration from Concord University.

Committees 

Mann serves as Chairman of the West Virginia Senate Education Committee. Mann serves as the Vice Chairman of the Natural Resources Committee and holds a place in Agriculture and Rural Development, Banking and Insurance, Economic Development, and Finance Committees.

Election results

References 

Year of birth missing (living people)
Living people
People from Bluefield, West Virginia
People from Monroe County, West Virginia
Republican Party West Virginia state senators
School board members in West Virginia
Concord University alumni
American funeral directors
21st-century American politicians